Krasnokamsky District (Krasnokama rayonı; , Qızıl Qama rayonı) is an administrative and municipal district (raion), one of the fifty-four in the Republic of Bashkortostan, Russia. It is located in the northwest of the republic and borders with the territory of the city of republic significance of Neftekamsk in the north, Yanaulsky District in the northeast, Kaltasinsky District in the east, Ilishevsky District in the south, the Republic of Tatarstan in the south and southwest, and with the Udmurt Republic in the west and northwest. Its administrative center is the rural locality (a selo) of Nikolo-Beryozovka. As of the 2010 Census, the total population of the district was 27,986, with the population of Nikolo-Beryozovka accounting for 21.8% of that number.

History
The district was established on January 31, 1935.

Administrative and municipal status
Within the framework of administrative divisions, Krasnokamsky District is one of the fifty-four in the Republic of Bashkortostan. The district is divided into fourteen selsoviets, comprising sixty-eight rural localities. As a municipal division, the district is incorporated as Krasnokamsky Municipal District. Its fourteen selsoviets are incorporated as fourteen rural settlements within the municipal district. The selo of Nikolo-Beryozovka serves as the administrative center of both the administrative and municipal district.

References

Notes

Sources

Districts of Bashkortostan
States and territories established in 1935